Tommaso Cascella senior (1890–1968) was an Italian painter, known for brightly colored landscapes.

Biography
He was born in Ortona in the Abruzzo. He trained in the Liceo Artistico of Giuseppe Misticoni. His younger siblings, Basilio, Michele (1907–1941), and Gioacchino were all painters. Tommaso traveled to Paris in 1909. Their house in Pescara is now the Museo Basilio Cascella.

References

1890 births
1968 deaths
People from Ortona
20th-century Italian painters
Italian male painters
19th-century Italian male artists
20th-century Italian male artists